The Canadian Neonatal Network (CNN) is an organization composed of neonatologists and neonatal health professionals from across Canada. The network was created in 1995 by Dr. Shoo Kim Lee, and currently its steering committee is composed of Drs. Keith Barrington, Aaron Chiu, Kim Dow, Jonathan Hellmann, Bruno Piedboeuf, Molly Seshia, Prakesh Shah (who also serves as the Associate Director of the Network) and Wendy Yee. Sandy Maksimowska currently holds the position of CNN Project Coordinator.

Recognition
The CNN was recognized in 2004 by the Canadian Institutes of Health Research (CIHR) with their "CIHR Knowledge Translation Award".  In the award citation, the CIHR described the CNN as "the archetype of the knowledge translation network in Canada."

Membership 
Canadian hospitals with tertiary NICUs can become institutional members, and individuals with research background in neonatology are welcomed to apply. All applications are screened through a steering committee.

Participating hospitals

References

External links 
 

Medical and health organizations based in Ontario
Neonatology